The Jarildekald (Yarilde) are an indigenous Australian people of South Australia originating on the eastern side of Lake Alexandrina and the Murray River.

Name
The tribal name Jarildekald is said to derive from 'Jarawalangan?', a phrase meaning 'Where shall we go?', referring to a tradition according to which on migrating from the interior to the mouth of the Murray River, the tribe at that point was perplexed as to where they were to continue their travels. They were grouped as the Ngarrindjeri by the early ethnographer George Taplin, though Norman Tindale and others have argued that while his data refer predominantly to the Jarildekald. It would be mistaken to confuse them with the Narinndjeri.

Language
Their dialect of Ngarrindjeri is known as Yarildewallin (Jaralde speech).

Country
The lands of the Jarildekald extended over some  They were located on the eastern side of Lake Alexandrina and the Murray River, their territory running from Loveday Bay on the Narrung Peninsula to Mobilong and east to Meningie and the Cookes Plains.

People
The Jarildekald people consisted of over 15 hordes. A. R. Radcliffe-Brown provided a list he said was incomplete, totally 22.

Alternative names
 Jaralde (short form)
 Lakalinyeri (horde at Point McLeay)
 Piccanini Murray people
 Warawalde (a northern horde at Nalpa)
 Yalawarre
 Yarilde, Yaralde, Yarrildie, Jaraldi, Yarildewallin (Jaralde speech)

Notes

Citations

Sources

Aboriginal peoples of South Australia